Spot Blue International Property is a UK based online Turkish real estate portal. It is a privately owned company, based in Surbiton, Greater London.

History

 In 2003, Spot Blue International Property was founded by David Walker, Director (Vice Chairman 2009 - 2013) at the Turkish British Chamber of Commerce and Industry (TBCCI).
 In 2004, Spot Blue became members of the National Association of Estate Agents (NAEA), the Association of International Property Professionals (AIPP) and The British Chamber of Commerce of Turkey (BCCT).
 In 2010, Spot Blue partnered with the overseas section of on-line property portal Rightmove, which was then followed by the website and magazine spin-offs of the British television series A Place in the Sun.
 Spot Blue contributes to the Channel 4 4homes Guide to Buying A Property In Turkey. In December 2013, CNBC quoted Mr. Walker on the rising interest in Turkish property.
 In June 2013, Julian Walker also wrote the market overview for the Bodrum region of Turkey for The New York Times.
 Late in 2008, when the latest James Bond movie, Quantum of Solace, was released, The Telegraph ran a feature on the settings of various Bond movies. Spot Blue provided information on Istanbul for this feature. The James Bond franchise later returned to Istanbul again for Skyfall.

References

External links
 
 Rightmove Overseas
 Turkish British Chamber of Commerce and Industry
 

British real estate websites
Property services companies of the United Kingdom